Johannes Oerding (born 26 December 1981) is a German singer-songwriter.

Early life
Oerding was born in Münster, North Rhine-Westphalia and raised in Geldern-Kapellen near the border of the Netherlands. His father is a country doctor, while his mother is a nurse. Oerding has two brothers and two sisters.

Oerding was discovered in 1999, when he performed at a local block party in Iserlohn. Later, he moved to the Netherlands to earn a diploma in International Marketing at Fontys University of Applied Sciences in Venlo. In 2006, he relocated to Hamburg to pursue a professional music career. There, he met singer-songwriter Michy Reincke, his neighbor at his new home in Barmbek-Süd, who garnered Oerding his first gigs.

Career
In 2009, Oerding his released his first single "Die Tage werden anders sein" on Columbia Records. The same year, his debut album Erste Wahl was released. Oerding worked with producers Mark "Big" Smith and Sven "Chef" Bünger on the majority of the album. While it failed to chart upon its initial release, a reissue of Erste Wahl, released in 2010, peaked at number 39 on the German Albums Chart when its single "Engel" received heavy radio rotation. The following year, Oerding's second album Boxer was released. It debuted at number eleven in Germany.
 
In 2013, Für immer ab jetzt, Oerding's third studio album, was released. It became his first top ten album in Germany, debuting at number four, and was eventually certified gold by Bundesverband Musikindustrie (BVMI). The album's first two singles, "Einfach nur weg" and "Nichts geht mehr", both entered the German Singles Chart. In September 2013, Oerding represented Hamburg with "Nichts geht mehr" in the Bundesvision Song Contest 2013; he finished second in the contest.

In 2015, Oerding released his fourth album Alles brennt. It debuted at number three on the German Albums Chart, marking his highest-charting album yet. It was eventually certified gold by Bundesverband Musikindustrie (BVMI). 

In 2021, he was a coach on the eleventh season of The Voice of Germany and won along with his artist Sebastian Krenz.

Discography

Studio albums

Singles

References

External links

Official website

1981 births
German  male singer-songwriters
Living people
Participants in the Bundesvision Song Contest
Musicians from Hamburg
21st-century German  male  singers
People from Geldern